Calladine is an English surname, originating in Nottinghamshire. While its exact meaning is unknown, it could possibly be a variant of Carwardine. Notable people with the surname include:
Charlie Calladine (1911–1983), English professional footballer
Christopher Calladine (born 1935), British engineer
Norm Calladine (1914–1988), professional ice hockey player

References

English-language surnames